Lauritz Christian Østrup (6 June 1881 – 21 May 1940) was a Danish fencer. He competed at the 1908 and 1912 Summer Olympics.

References

1881 births
1940 deaths
Danish male fencers
Olympic fencers of Denmark
Fencers at the 1908 Summer Olympics
Fencers at the 1912 Summer Olympics
Sportspeople from Copenhagen